Browns Valley can refer to several locations in the United States:

Browns Valley, California
Browns Valley, Indiana
Browns Valley, Minnesota
Browns Valley divide
Browns Valley Township, Big Stone County, Minnesota